Bridgeview is a village in Cook County, Illinois, United States. As of the 2020 census, the village population was 17,027.

History
The earliest settlement in Bridgeview occurred in the 1830s, when the area was still populated by Native American groups. By the 1870s German and Italian settlers began moving into the area for farming purposes. Dutch migrated to the area by the 1920s, at which time farming began to decline; real estate and industry began to develop the area considerably. After Lake Michigan water became available to the area, the population grew significantly.  The Bridgeview Community Club was founded in 1938 and became the center of local activities.

Bridgeview was incorporated in 1947 with an initial population of approximately 500 residents. Local residents chose the name "Bridgeview" by one vote over "Oketo", which remains a street name in the village today. The term "Bridgeview" connotes views of the area from the Harlem Avenue bridge, 79th Street bridge and 87th Street bridge.

Arab Americans are a growing presence, making up 10.8 percent of the population in 2020. In 1981, an Islamic social club was established and by 1984 it had become a mosque. Two Islamic schools in Bridgeview educate hundreds of students from K-12.

Bridgeview's motto is "A Well Balanced Community", as the village's zoning is divided equally into residential, commercial, and industrial areas. Its proximity to Chicago's Midway Airport and downtown, along with access to major highways, has made it a crossroads of the inner southwest suburbs.

The Fifth District Circuit Court of Cook County is located in Bridgeview near 103rd Street and 76th Avenue.

Geography

The village has a roughly rectangular shape; its borders running north and south stagger between 8300 West and 6800 West, but can generally be defined as between Roberts Road and Harlem Avenue. The southern border of the town is 103rd Street between 76th Avenue and Harlem. The northern border is staggered between 6700 South on the west side of the rail tracks and 6900 South on the east side of the rail tracks.

Bridgeview borders the following communities: Bedford Park, Nottingham Park (unincorporated Cook County, often considered part of Chicago due to its 60638 ZIP code), Burbank, Oak Lawn, Chicago Ridge, Palos Hills, Hickory Hills and Justice.

Demographics
As of the 2020 census there were 17,027 people, 5,613 households, and 3,807 families residing in the village. The racial makeup of the village was 70.05% White, 4.04% African American, 3.34% Asian, 0.85% Native American, 0.03% Pacific Islander, 10.72% from other races, and 10.96% from two or more races. Hispanic or Latino of any race were 23.44% of the population.

There were 5,613 households, out of which 54.68% had children under the age of 18 living with them, 46.32% were married couples living together, 13.33% had a female householder with no husband present, and 32.18% were non-families. 27.10% of all households were made up of individuals, and 8.75% had someone living alone who was 65 years of age or older. The average household size was 3.27 and the average family size was 2.68.

The village's age distribution consisted of 22.1% under the age of 18, 7.6% from 18 to 24, 30.9% from 25 to 44, 23.6% from 45 to 64, and 15.9% who were 65 years of age or older. The median age was 37.5 years. For every 100 females, there were 97.1 males. For every 100 females age 18 and over, there were 90.7 males.

The median income for a household in the village was $55,102, and the median income for a family was $64,281. Males had a median income of $40,097 versus $32,451 for females. The per capita income for the village was $26,074. About 11.5% of families and 14.5% of the population were below the poverty line, including 22.0% of those under age 18 and 9.6% of those age 65 or over.

Note: the US Census treats Hispanic/Latino as an ethnic category. This table excludes Latinos from the racial categories and assigns them to a separate category. Hispanics/Latinos can be of any race.

Arts and culture

Harlem Avenue
Numerous self-owned businesses create an atmosphere similar to that of some Arab diaspora communities across the world. Businesses include ethnic grocery stores (containing imported groceries and appliances used to cook regional dishes, cultural souvenirs, and calling cards used specifically for customers to use when speaking to relatives overseas), hookah lounges, and Middle Eastern sweet shops. The majority of Arab business owners on Harlem Avenue are from Palestine and Jordan.

Sports
Bridgeview was the home of the Chicago Fire professional Major League Soccer team between 2006 and 2019, whose stadium was funded and operated by the village. SeatGeek Stadium is also home of the NISA's team, Chicago House AC, the Fire Reserves, Bridgeview Fire Premier,the Chicago Red Stars of the National Women's Soccer League and the Chicago Hounds of Major League Rugby. Toyota Park hosted the 2006 Major League Soccer All-Star Game, and continues to be a premier venue for important concerts. The village has developed a plan to have a mixed commercial and residential zone near the stadium to give the town a commercial and residential hub near the stadium. Development has not yet been approved.

Government
Bridgeview is in Illinois's 3rd congressional district.

Education 

Public elementary school districts serving Bridgeview include:
 Indian Springs School District 109
 Two Indian Springs schools are in the city limits: Bridgeview Elementary School and Lyle Elementary School.
 Cook County School District 104
 North Palos School District 117
 Residential areas of the North Palos School District section are zoned to Dorn Elementary School, Glen Oaks Elementary School, and Conrady Middle School; all three schools are in Hickory Hills.
 Ridgeland School District 122
 Residents are zoned to Lieb Elementary in Bridgeview and Simmons Middle School in Oak Lawn.

High school districts:
 Argo Community High School (District 217)
 Oak Lawn Community High School (District 229)
 Consolidated High School District 230
 Amos Alonzo Stagg High School serves the section of Bridgeview in District 230

Private schools in Bridgeview:
 Aqsa School (Islamic K-12)
 Universal School (Islamic K-12)

K-8 private schools in the surrounding area:
 St. Albert the Great School (Burbank)
 St. Louis DeMontfort School (Oak Lawn)
 St. Patricia School (Hickory Hills)
 Zion Lutheran School (Summit)

Moraine Valley Community College serves area residents.

The Bridgeview Public Library serves residents of the village.

Notable people 

 Mark Barnett, a former professional motocross racer.
 Brent Bowers, a former MLB outfielder.
 Todd Rogers, video game player; former resident
 Chuck Sanow, bodybuilding champion

References

External links 

 Village of Bridgeview

1947 establishments in Illinois
Arab-American culture in Illinois
Chicago metropolitan area
Populated places established in 1947
Villages in Cook County, Illinois
Villages in Illinois